Francis Downes (1606–1648) was an English politician who sat in the House of Commons in 1624 and 1625.

Downes was the second son of Roger Downes of Wardley Hall, and his second wife Anne Calvert, daughter of John Calvert of Cockeram. His mother was a Catholic and Downes also adopted the Catholic faith. He matriculated at Brasenose College, Oxford on 5 December 1623, aged 17 and was a student of Gray's Inn in 1623. In 1624, he was elected member of parliament for Wigan. He was re-elected MP for Wigan in 1625.

References

1606 births
1648 deaths
English MPs 1624–1625
English MPs 1625